The Nice French Riviera Open (or Open de Nice Côte d'Azur in French) was an ATP World Tour 250 series and, formerly, Grand Prix tennis circuit affiliated men's tennis tournament. This tournament was originally founded in 1895 as the Nice International also known as the Nice Lawn Tennis Club Championships. It was held in Nice, France at the Nice Lawn Tennis Club and played on outdoor clay courts. The last singles champion is Dominic Thiem from Austria.

Originally part of the Grand Prix tennis circuit between 1970 and 1989. The event was played under various (sponsored) names from 1971 through 1995. In 2010 Nice became the location of a World Tour 250 series clay court tournament, replacing the Interwetten Austrian Open in Kitzbühel, Austria on the ATP calendar. It was scheduled a week before the French Open. In November 2016 it was announced that the tournament would be replaced on the 2017 calendar by a new event, the Lyon Open, because the venue in Nice at the Nice Lawn Tennis Club could not be expanded.

Ilie Năstase, Björn Borg, Henri Leconte, Nicolás Almagro, and Dominic Thiem have each won the singles title twice.

Past finals

Singles

Doubles

See also 
 List of tennis tournaments
 Nice Lawn Tennis Club
 Interwetten Austrian Open Kitzbühel

References

External links 

 
 ATP tournament profile
 ATP results archive

 
Nice
Nice
Nice
Sport in Nice
Recurring sporting events established in 1971
1971 establishments in France
Grand Prix tennis circuit
2016 disestablishments in France
Recurring sporting events disestablished in 2016